John Hlengani Bilankulu (born 19 February 1966) is a South African politician from Limpopo. He has been a Member of Parliament (MP) in the National Assembly of South Africa since May 2019. Bilankulu is a member of the African National Congress.

Parliamentary career
Bilankulu was ranked number 5 on the regional Limpopo list of the African National Congress for the 8 May 2019 national and provincial elections. After the elections, he was allocated a seat in the National Assembly. He was sworn into the 6th Parliament on 22 May.

In June 2019, he was named to the  Portfolio Committee on Mineral Resources and Energy. Bilankulu also serves an alternate member of the Portfolio Committee on Transport.

References

External links

Mr John Hlengani Bilankulu at Parliament of South Africa

1966 births
Place of birth missing (living people)
People from Limpopo
African National Congress politicians
Members of the National Assembly of South Africa
21st-century South African politicians
Living people